Vermont law required a majority for election, which frequently mandated runoff elections.  The , and  districts both required second elections in this election cycle, and the 3rd district required a third election.

See also 
 United States House of Representatives elections, 1804 and 1805
 List of United States representatives from Vermont

Notes 

1804
Vermont
United States House of Representatives